Lumea (Romanian: The World) was a monthly magazine on international politics published in Bucharest, Romania, between 1963 and 1993.

History and profile
Lumea was established by George Ivascu in 1963. It is the successor of Timpuri Noi and modeled on Western magazines. At the beginning the magazine attempted to provide an alternative perspective about international politics. However, later it became a mainstream publication, being compliant to the communist regime. In 1993 the magazine folded.

References

External links
  Lumea online 
 WorldCat record

1963 establishments in Romania
1993 disestablishments in Romania
Communist magazines
Defunct magazines published in Romania
Defunct political magazines
Eastern Bloc mass media
Magazines established in 1963
Magazines disestablished in 1993
Magazines published in Bucharest
Monthly magazines published in Romania
Political magazines published in Romania
Romanian-language magazines